Mark Endert is a Grammy award winning American music producer, mixer, arranger and musician.

Biography
From the early 1990s to the present, Endert is credited on albums spanning a wide array of musical genres with sales totaling more than 90 million albums worldwide.

Billboard #1 Singles include "This Love" (Maroon 5), "I Don't Want to Be" (Gavin Degraw) and "Everything You Want" (Vertical Horizon).

Endert has been nominated for numerous Grammy Awards including Album of the Year Nominations; Madonna's Ray of Light and Sara Bareilles'  The Blessed Unrest. He received a Grammy Award for Lauren Daigle's Look Up Child album.

Notable album credits

Notable song credits

Personal life

Endert married in 2004, and the following year moved from the Los Angeles area to the east coast of Florida to start a family.  Since then he has enjoyed balancing his professional and family life with his wife, son, and daughter.

Notes and references 

Record producers from California
Living people
Musicians from California
Year of birth missing (living people)